The World Triathlon Cup is an annual series of triathlon races staged around the world. The series is organised by the World Triathlon, the world governing body of the sport. Inaugurated in 1991, the World Cup began as an attempt to create a regular season under its management in tandem with the ITU Triathlon World Championship race. However, this meant that there was a World Cup champion as well as a world champion. Following the 2008 series the ITU reorganized its top level competitions and created the World Triathlon Series, a series of races that was to be the successor of the World Championship. Meanwhile, the World Cup was relegated to become a second tier series, as a result the number of races in the World Cup were reduced. Since the reformat, points earned in World Cup racing are now applied only to an athlete's World Ranking.

Points
At its founding the first twenty athletes each race would earn points dependent on their placing and the athletes with the most points at the end of the season would be named the World cup champion. 

With the reorganization in 2009 and the discontinuation of the world cup champion title it was decided that world cup points should contribute to an athlete's world series. This was managed by allowing athletes best two world cup placements could be considered as part of their world series ranking. However, due ranking being based on an athlete's four highest scoring appearances that year along with the fact that world series races were worth 2.5 times as much as a world cup meant that no contribution was made to any athlete in the top 10.

{| class="wikitable" style="font-size:95%">
|+(2009-2014)
|-
!Place
!1st
!2nd
!3rd
!4
!5
!6
!7
!8
!9
!10
!11
!12
!13
!14
!15
!16
!17
!18
!19
!20
!21
!22
!23
!24
!25
!26
!27
!28
!29
!30
|-
|Points
|300
|278
|257
|237
|220
|203
|188
|174
|161
|149
|138
|127118
|109
|101
|93
|86
|80
|74
|68
|6358
|54
|50
|46
|43
|40
|37
|34
|31
|}

After 2014 world cup points totals were increased awarding first place 500 points and each subsequent athlete 7.5% less points that the athlete before for the first 50 athletes as long as they made the time cut (5% to the winner's time in the men's event and 8% in the women's event). However the points would no longer contribute to an athlete's world series score and only to an athlete's world ranking.

Sponsors
BG Group were title sponsors of the series from 2006 to 2008.

Winners
The World Cup champions are based on the final accumulated point totals as earned in each year's series of World Cup races, with double points awarded for results achieved in the ITU Triathlon World Championship race. The declared champions from 1991 to 2008 are:

See also
Hy-Vee Triathlon
Mooloolaba Triathlon
Noosa Triathlon
Salford Triathlon

References

External links
ITU website - Event archives

 
Triathlon World Cup
World Cup